The 2003 Cornell Big Red football team represented Cornell University in the 2003 NCAA Division I-AA football season. They were led by third-year head coach Tim Pendergast and played their home games at Schoellkopf Field in Hamilton, New York, compiling a 1–9 overall record. Cornell finished last in the Ivy League, with a 0–7 mark against conference opponents.

Schedule

References

Cornell
Cornell Big Red football seasons
Cornell Big Red football